Antarctoxylon is a morphogenus of angiosperms that is found in the Coniacian of Antarctica. The most recently named species, A. mixai, is found in the Hidden Lake Formation on James Ross Island. All the other species, named by Poole and Cantrill, are found on Williams Point, Livingston Island.

References 

Prehistoric angiosperm genera
Late Cretaceous plants
Fossil taxa described in 2001